13474 Vʹyus, provisional designation , is a background asteroid from the central asteroid belt, approximately  in diameter. It was discovered on 29 August 1973, by Soviet astronomer Tamara Smirnova at the Crimean Astrophysical Observatory in Nauchnyj on the Crimean peninsula. The asteroid has a rotation period of 6.6 hours and is likely elongated in shape. It was named after Yurij Sergeevich Vasil'ev, rector of the former Saint Petersburg State Technical University in Russia.

Orbit and classification 

Vʹyus is a non-family asteroid from the main belt's background population. It orbits the Sun in the central asteroid belt at a distance of 1.9–3.4 AU once every 4 years and 3 months (1,551 days; semi-major axis of 2.62 AU). Its orbit has an eccentricity of 0.29 and an inclination of 8° with respect to the ecliptic.

Naming 

This minor planet was named after Yurij Sergeevich Vasil'ev (Yurij Vasilyev; born 1929), expert in hydropower engineering and rector of the Saint Petersburg State Technical University (SPbSTU), now known as the Peter the Great St. Petersburg Polytechnic University in Russia. The official  was published by the Minor Planet Center on 27 April 2002.

Physical characteristics 

The asteroid's spectral type is unknown. The Lightcurve Data Base assumes an S- or C-type to be equally likely, using an averaged value for its albedo (see below).

Rotation period 

In September 2007, a rotational lightcurve of Vʹyus was obtained from photometric observations by Maurice Clark at the Montgomery College Observatory in Maryland, United States. Lightcurve analysis gave a well-defined rotation period of 6.587 hours with a brightness amplitude of 0.85 magnitude. A high brightness amplitude typically indicates that the body has an elongated rather than spherical shape.

Diameter and albedo 

According to the survey carried out by the NEOWISE mission of NASA's Wide-field Infrared Survey Explorer, Vʹyus measures 6.922 and 7.876 kilometers in diameter and its surface has an albedo of 0.147 and 0.113, respectively. The Collaborative Asteroid Lightcurve Link assumes an albedo of 0.10 – a compromise value between the stony (0.20) and carbonaceous (0.057) asteroid's, both abundant in the main belt's central region – and calculates a diameter of 7.65 kilometers based on an absolute magnitude of 13.7.

Notes

References

External links 
 Asteroid Lightcurve Database (LCDB), query form (info )
 Dictionary of Minor Planet Names, Google books
 Discovery Circumstances: Numbered Minor Planets (10001)-(15000) – Minor Planet Center
 
 

013474
Discoveries by Tamara Mikhaylovna Smirnova
V'yus
19730829